Antanas Ričardas Druvė ((b. 1867 in Pavirvytys estate, Tryškiai Parish – d. 17 February 1919) was a Lithuanian military officer and Russian colonel of the General Staff.

Considered to be of French origin, Druvė was born in the Pavirvytis country-estate area (Lithuania), which belonged to the noblemen of the Grand Duchy of Lithuania. After Napoleon's march on Russia, the only person who remained at the country-estate was Drovė's grandfather. He later went on to finish at the General Staff Academy. While at the cavalry school, he was a friend of future Finnish president, Gustaf Mannerheim. During the Russian-Japanese War of 1905, Druvė was seriously wounded. During World War I, in the autumn of 1915, Druvė led the 43rd Regiment of the Russian Cavalry, where he was noted for his fighting against the Germans near the River Daugava. Later he served as an officer in the North-Western front, as a member of staff for operations personnel.

In 1919, with encouragement of Povilas Plechavičius, he secretly returned to Lithuania. He organized anti-Soviet national partisan squads in the towns of Eigirdžiai, Raudėnai, Tryškiai and Ubiškė. Drovė was killed in his home town during an ambush by the Red Army.

References 

1867 births
1919 deaths
Lithuanian Army officers
Russian people of French descent
Lithuanian people of French descent
Military personnel of the Russian Empire